Between 1639 and 1652, Scotland was involved in the Wars of the Three Kingdoms, a series of wars starting with the Bishops' Wars (between Scotland and England), the Irish Rebellion of 1641, the English Civil War (and its extension in Scotland), the Irish Confederate Wars, and finally the subjugation of Ireland and Scotland by the English Roundhead New Model Army.

In Scotland itself, from 1644 to 1645 a Scottish civil war was fought between Scottish Royalists—supporters of Charles I under James Graham, 1st Marquis of Montrose—and the Covenanters, who had controlled Scotland since 1639 and allied with the English Parliament.  The Scottish Royalists, aided by Irish troops, had a rapid series of victories in 1644–45, but were eventually defeated by the Covenanters.

The Covenanters then found themselves at odds with the English Parliament, so they crowned Charles II at Scone and thus stated their intention to place him on the thrones of England and Ireland as well. This led to the Anglo-Scottish war (1650–1652), when Scotland was invaded and occupied by the New Model Army under Oliver Cromwell.

Origins of the war – wars in three kingdoms
The war originated in Scottish opposition to religious reforms imposed on the Church of Scotland or kirk by Charles I. This culminated in February 1638 when representatives from all sections of Scottish society agreed a National Covenant, pledging resistance to liturgical 'innovations.' An important factor in the political contest with Charles was the Covenanter belief they were preserving an established and divinely ordained form of religion which he was seeking to alter. The Covenant also expressed wider dissatisfaction with the sidelining of Scotland since the Stuart kings became monarchs of England in 1603, while the kirk was viewed as a symbol of Scottish independence. 

Victory in the 1639 and 1640 Bishops Wars left the Covenanters firmly in control of Scotland but also destabilised Ireland and England. Widespread opposition to Royal policies meant the Parliament of England refused to fund war against the Scots, leading Charles to consider raising an army of Irish Catholics in return for abolishing discriminatory laws against them. This prospect alarmed his enemies in both England and Scotland; when the Covenanters threatened to provide military support for their co-religionists in Ulster, it sparked the Irish Rebellion of 1641, which quickly degenerated into massacres of Protestant settlers in Ireland.

The Covenanters responded in April 1642 by sending an army to Ulster led by Robert Monro, which engaged in equally bloody reprisals against Catholics. Although both Charles and Parliament supported raising English troops to suppress the Irish rising, neither side trusted the other with their control. A struggle for control of military resources ultimately led to the outbreak of the First English Civil War in August 1642.

Scottish Royalists and Covenanters

The Scottish Reformation established a kirk that was Presbyterian in structure and  Calvinist in doctrine. By 1640, less than 2% of Scots were Catholics, concentrated in places like South Uist, controlled by Clanranald, but despite its minority status, fear of "Popery" remained widespread. Since Calvinists believed a 'well-ordered' monarchy was part of God's plan, the Covenanters committed to "defend the king's person and authority with our goods, bodies, and lives" and the idea of government without a king was inconceivable. 

This meant that unlike England, throughout the war all Scots agreed the institution of monarchy was divinely ordered and hence why the Covenanters supported the restoration of Charles I in the Second English Civil War, then his son in the Third. Where Covenanters and Scottish Royalists disagreed was the nature and extent of Royal authority versus that of the people, including through the popularly governed Presbyterian church; the relative narrowness of this distinction meant Montrose was not unusual in fighting on both sides.

Royalism was most prominent in the Scottish Highlands and Aberdeenshire, due to a mix of religious, cultural and political reasons; Montrose switched sides because he distrusted Argyll's ambition, fearing he would eventually dominate Scotland and possibly depose the King. Furthermore, the Gàidhealtachd was a distinct cultural, political and economic region of Scotland. It was Gaelic in language and customs and at this time was largely outside of the control of the Scottish government. Some Highland clans preferred the more distant authority of King Charles to the powerful and well organised Lowlands based government of the Covenanters.

Clan politics and feuds also played a role; when the Presbyterian Campbell, led by their chief, Archibald Campbell, 1st Marquess of Argyll, sided with the Covenanters, their rivals automatically took the opposing side. It should be said some of these factors overlap that spanned the Irish Sea: for instance, the MacDonalds were Catholics, were sworn enemies of the Campbells, and had a strong Gaelic identity. Historian David Stevenson writes: "It is a moot point whether one should call the MacDonnells of Antrim Scots or Irish... To the MacDonnells themselves the question was largely irrelevant, they had more in common with native Irish and Scots Highlanders, with whom they shared a common Gaelic language and culture than with those who ruled them".

The Irish intervention

Montrose had already tried and failed to lead a Royalist uprising by 1644 when he was presented with a ready-made Royalist army. The Irish Confederates, who were loosely aligned with the Royalists, agreed in that year to send an expedition to Scotland. From their point of view, this would tie up Scottish Covenanter troops who would otherwise be used in Ireland or England. The Irish sent 1500 men to Scotland under the command of Alasdair MacColla MacDonald, a MacDonald clansman from the Western Isles of Scotland. They included Manus O'Cahan (an Irish cousin to MacColla) and his 500-man regiment. Shortly after landing, the Irish linked up with Montrose at Blair Atholl and proceeded to raise forces from the MacDonalds and other anti-Campbell Highland clans.

The new Royalist army led by Montrose and MacColla was in some respects very formidable. Its Irish and Highland troops were extremely mobile, marching quickly over long distances – even over the rugged Highland terrain – and were capable of enduring very harsh conditions and poor rations. They did not fight in the massed pike and musket formations that dominated continental Europe at the time, but fired their muskets in loose order before closing with swords and half-pikes. This tactic was effective in such a wilderness and swept away the poorly trained Covenanter militias that were sent against them. These locally raised levies frequently ran away when faced with a terrifying Highland charge, and were slaughtered as they ran.

However, the Royalist army also had major problems: the clans from the west of Scotland could not be persuaded to fight for long away from their homes – seeing their principal enemy as the Campbells rather than the Covenanters, which resulted in fluctuating membership – and the Royalists also lacked cavalry, leaving them vulnerable in open country. Montrose overcame some of these disadvantages through his leadership and by taking advantage of the forbidding Highland mountains. Keeping his enemies guessing where he would strike next, Montrose would sally out to attack lowland garrisons and withdraw to the Highlands when threatened by the more numerous enemy. In the safety of the mountains, he could fight on terrain familiar to his army, or lead the Covenanters on wild goose chases.

The year of Royalist triumph and collapse
 
From 1644 to 1645 Montrose led the Royalists to six famous victories, defeating covenanting armies larger than his own of roughly 2000 men (except at Kilsyth, where he led approximately 5,000).

In the Autumn of 1644, the Royalists marched across the Highlands to Perth, where they smashed a Covenanter force at the Battle of Tippermuir on 1 September. Shortly afterwards, another Covenanter militia met a similar fate outside Aberdeen on 13 September. Unwisely, Montrose let his men pillage Perth and Aberdeen after taking them, leading to hostility to his forces in an area where Royalist sympathies had been strong.

Following these victories, MacColla insisted on pursuing the MacDonald's war against the Campbells in Argyll in western Scotland. In December 1644, the Royalists rampaged through the Campbells' country. During the clan warfare Inveraray was torched and all armed men were put to the sword; approximately 900 Campbells were killed. 

In response to the attack on his clansmen, Archibald Campbell, 1st Marquess of Argyll assembled the Campbell clansmen to repel the invaders. Montrose, finding himself trapped in the Great Glen between Argyll and Covenanters advancing from Inverness, decided on a flanking march through the wintry mountains of Lochaber and surprised Argyll at the battle of Inverlochy (2 February 1645). The Covenanters and Campbells were crushed, with losses of 1,500.

Montrose's famous march was acclaimed as "one of the great exploits in the history of British arms" by John Buchan and C.V. Wedgwood. The victory at Inverlochy gave the Royalists control over the western Highlands and attracted other clans and noblemen to their cause. The most important of these were the Gordons, who provided the Royalists with cavalry for the first time.

Inverlochy was an important strategic victory for the Royalists, because the Scottish Covenanter army in England was ordered to send a proportion of their force north to help bolster the Covenanter forces in Scotland. This significantly weakened the Scottish army in England and it was only the lack of Royalist infantry and artillery in the north of England that prevented Prince Rupert from attacking them. In April 1645, to hinder the northwards movement of English Royalist field artillery, Oliver Cromwell led a cavalry raid into the English Midlands. The raid was the first active operation carried out by the newly formed New Model Army.

In April Montrose was surprised by General William Baillie after a raid on Dundee, but eluded capture by having his troops double back on the coast road and fleeing inland in a corkscrew retreat. Another Covenanter army under John Urry was hastily assembled and sent against the Royalists. At Auldearn, near Nairn, Montrose placed Macdonald and most of infantry in view of the enemy and concealed the cavalry and remaining infantry. Despite Macdonald attacking prematurely, the ruse worked, and Urry was defeated on 9 May.

Another cat-and-mouse game between Bailie and Montrose led to the Battle of Alford on 2 July. Montrose confronted the Covenanters after the latter had forded the Don, forcing them to fight with the river at their back and on uneven ground. The Royalists triumphed and advanced into the lowlands. Bailie went in pursuit and Montrose waited for him at Kilsyth. During the ensuing battle the Royalists were inadvertently aided by Argyll and other members of the "Committee of Estates," who ordered Bailie to make a flank march across the front of the Royalist army, which pounced on them and triumphed.

After Kilsyth (15 August), Montrose seemed to have won control of all Scotland: In late 1645, such prominent towns as Dundee and Glasgow fell to his forces. The Covenanting government had temporarily collapsed, paying for its over-confidence in defeating Royalist resistance. As the royally commissioned lieutenant-governor and captain-general of Scotland, Montrose used his powers to summon parliament to meet in Glasgow, but the limitations of his triumph soon became clear. King Charles was in no position to join the Royalists in Scotland, and though Montrose wanted to further Royalist objectives by raising troops in the southeast of Scotland and marching on England, MacColla showed that his priorities lay with the war of the MacDonalds against the Campbells and occupied Argyll. The Gordons also returned home, to defend their own lands in the northeast.

During his campaign, Montrose had been unable to attract many lowland royalists to his cause. Even after Kilsyth few joined him, having been alienated by his use of Irish Catholic troops, who were "regarded as barbarians as well as enemies of true religion." Additionally, his covenanting past "left lingering mistrust among royalists." 

Montrose, his forces having split up, was surprised and defeated by the Covenanters, led by David Leslie, at the Battle of Philiphaugh. Approximately 100 Irish prisoners, having surrendered upon promise of quarter, were executed, and 300 of the Royalist army's camp followers – mostly women and children – were killed in cold blood.  MacColla retreated to Kintyre, where he held out until the following year. In September 1646 Montrose fled to Norway. The Royalist victories in Scotland had evaporated almost overnight owing to the disunited nature of their forces.

The end of the civil war in Scotland
The First English Civil War had ended in May 1646, when Charles I surrendered to the Scottish Covenanter army in England. After failing to persuade the King to take the Covenant, the Scots finally handed him over to the commissioners of the English Parliament (the "Long Parliament") in early 1647. At the same time they received part payment for the service of their army in England, which then returned north. In 1646, Montrose left for Norway, while MacColla returned to Ireland with his remaining Irish and Highland troops to re-join the Confederates. Those who had fought for Montrose, particularly the Irish, were massacred by the Covenanters whenever they were captured, in reprisal for the atrocities the Royalists had committed in Argyll.

Scotland and the Second Civil War

Ironically, no sooner had the Covenanters defeated the Royalists at home than they were negotiating with Charles I against the English Parliament. The Covenanters could not get their erstwhile allies to agree on a political and religious settlement to the wars, failing to get Presbyterianism established as the official religion in the Three Kingdoms and fearing that the Parliamentarians would threaten Scottish independence. Many Covenanters feared that under Parliament, "our poor country should be made a province of England." A faction of the Covenanters known as the Engagers, led by the Duke of Hamilton, therefore sent an army to England to try to restore Charles I in 1648. However, it was routed by Oliver Cromwell's New Model Army at the battle of Preston and annihilated at the battle of Winwick. This intervention on behalf of the King caused a brief civil war within the Covenanting movement. The most hardline Presbyterians under the Earl of Argyll rebelled against the main Scottish army under David Leslie. The two factions came to blows at the Battle of Stirling in September 1648, before a peace was hastily negotiated.

Charles was executed by the Rump Parliament in 1649, and Hamilton, who had been captured after Preston, was executed soon after. This left the extreme covenanters, still led by Argyll, as the main force in the Kingdom.

Montrose's defeat and death

In June 1649, Montrose was restored by the exiled Charles II to the now nominal lieutenancy of Scotland. Charles also opened negotiations with the Covenanters, now dominated by Argyll's radical Presbyterian "Kirk Party". Because Montrose had very little support in the lowlands, Charles was willing to disavow his most consistent supporter in order to become a king on terms dictated by the Covenanters. In March 1650 Montrose landed in Orkney to take the command of a small force, composed mainly of continental mercenaries, which he had sent on before him. Crossing to the mainland, Montrose tried in vain to raise the clans, and on 27 April he was surprised and routed at the Battle of Carbisdale in Ross-shire. After wandering for some time he was surrendered by Neil Macleod of Assynt, to whose protection, in ignorance of Macleod's political enmity, he had entrusted himself. He was brought a prisoner to Edinburgh, and on 20 May sentenced to death by the Parliament. He was hanged on the 21st, with Wishart's laudatory biography of him put round his neck. To the last he protested that he was a real Covenanter and a loyal subject.

Anglo-Scottish war, 1650–1652
In spite of their conflict with the Scottish Royalists, the Covenanters then committed themselves to the cause of Charles II, signing the Treaty of Breda (1650) with him in the hope of securing an independent Presbyterian Scotland free of English Parliamentary interference. Charles landed in Scotland at Garmouth in Moray on 23 June 1650 and signed the 1638 Covenant and the 1643 Solemn League immediately after coming ashore.

The threat posed by King Charles II with his new Covenanter allies was considered to be the greatest facing the new English Republic so Oliver Cromwell left some of his lieutenants in Ireland to continue the suppression of the Irish Royalists and returned to England in May. He arrived in Scotland on 22 July 1650, advancing along the east coast towards Edinburgh. By the end of August, his army was reduced by disease and running out of supplies, so he was forced to order a retreat towards his base at the port of Dunbar. A Scottish Covenanter army under the command of David Leslie had been shadowing his progress. Seeing some of Cromwell's sick troops being taken on board the waiting ships, Leslie made ready to attack what he believed was a weakened remnant (though some historians report that he was ordered to fight against his better judgment by the Covenanter General Assembly). Cromwell seized the opportunity, and the New Model Army inflicted a crushing defeat on the Scots at the subsequent Battle of Dunbar on 3 September. Leslie's army, which had strong ideological ties to the radical Kirk Party, was destroyed, losing over 14,000 men killed, wounded and taken prisoner. Cromwell's army then took Edinburgh and by the end of the year his army had occupied much of southern Scotland.

This military disaster discredited the radical Covenanters known as the Kirk Party and caused the Covenanters and Scottish Royalists to bury their differences (at least temporarily) to try to repel the English Parliamentarian  invasion of Scotland. The Scottish Parliament passed the Act of Levy in December 1650, requiring every burgh and shire to raise a quota of soldiers. A new round of conscription was undertaken, both in the Highlands and the Lowlands, to form a truly national army named the Army of the Kingdom, that was put under the command of Charles II himself. Although this was actually the largest force put into the field by the Scots during the Wars, it was badly trained and its morale was low as many of its constituent Royalist and Covenanter parts had until recently been killing each other.

In July 1651, under the command of General John Lambert, part of Cromwell's force crossed the Firth of Forth into Fife and defeated the Scots at the Battle of Inverkeithing. The New Model Army advanced towards the royal base at Perth. In danger of being outflanked, Charles ordered his army south into England in a desperate last-ditch attempt to evade Cromwell and spark a Royalist uprising there. Cromwell followed Charles into England leaving George Monck to finish the campaign in Scotland. Meanwhile, Monck took Stirling on 14 August and Dundee on 1 September, reportedly killing up to 2,000 of its 12,000 population and destroying every ship in the city's harbour, 60 in total.

The Scottish Army of the Kingdom marched towards the west of England because it was in that area that English Royalist sympathies were strongest. However, although some English Royalists joined the army, they came in far fewer numbers than Charles and his Scottish supporters had hoped. Cromwell finally engaged the new king at Worcester on 3 September 1651, and beat him – in the process all but wiping out his army, killing 3,000 and taking 10,000 prisoners. Many of the Scottish prisoners taken by Cromwell were sold into indentured labour in the West Indies, Virginia and Berwick, Maine. This defeat marked the real end of the Scottish war effort. Charles escaped to the European continent and with his flight, the Covenanters' hopes for political independence from the Commonwealth of England were dashed.

From occupation to Restoration

Between 1651 and 1654 a Royalist rising took place in Scotland. Dunnottar Castle was the last stronghold to fall to the English Parliament's troops in May 1652. Under the terms of the Tender of Union, the Scots were given 30 seats in a united Parliament in London, with General Monck appointed as the military governor of Scotland. During the Interregnum, Scotland was kept under the military occupation of an English army under George Monck. Sporadic Royalist rebellions continued throughout the Commonwealth period in Scotland, particularly in western Highlands, where Alasdair MacColla had raised his forces in the 1640s. The northwest Highlands was the scene of another pro-Royalist uprising in 1653–55, which was only put down with the deployment of 6,000 English troops there. Monck garrisoned forts all over the Highlands – for example at Inverness, and finally put an end to Royalist resistance when he began deporting prisoners to the West Indies as indentured labourers. However, lawlessness remained a problem, with bandits known as mosstroopers, very often former Royalist or Covenanter soldiers, plundering both the English troops and the civilian population.

After the death of Oliver Cromwell in 1658, the factions and divisions which had struggled for supremacy during the early years of the interregnum reemerged. Monck, who had served Cromwell and the English Parliament throughout the civil wars, judged that his best interests and those of his country lay in the Restoration of Charles II. In 1660, he marched his troops south from Scotland to ensure the monarchy's reinstatement. Scotland's Parliament and legislative autonomy were restored under The Restoration though many issues that had led to the wars; religion, Scotland's form of government and the status of the Highlands, remained unresolved. After the Glorious Revolution of 1688, many more Scots would die over the same disputes in Jacobite rebellions.

The cost
It is estimated that roughly 28,000 men were killed in combat in Scotland itself during the Wars of the Three Kingdoms. More soldiers usually died of disease than in action at this time (the ratio was often 3–1), so it is reasonable to speculate that the true military death toll is higher than this figure. In addition, it is estimated that around 15,000 civilians died as a direct result of the war – either through massacres or by disease. More indirectly, another 30,000 people died of the plague in Scotland between 1645 and 1649, a disease that was partly spread by the movement of armies throughout the country. If we also take into account the thousands of Scottish troops who died in the civil wars in England and Ireland (another 20,000 soldiers at least), the Wars of the Three Kingdoms certainly represent one of the bloodiest episodes in Scottish history.

Timeline

Scottish factions
Labels applied to the various Scottish factions differ among sources. This timeline labels factions as follows. Bold cell entries indicate the faction in control of the Scottish government during most of that period.

Timeline of Scotland in the Wars of the Three Kingdoms

See also
 Chronology of the Wars of the Three Kingdoms
 History of Scotland
 Timeline of the Wars of the Three Kingdoms

References

Sources

Further reading

Stewart, Laura. 2019. Rethinking the Scottish Revolution: Covenanted Scotland, 1637–1651. Oxford University Press.

External links
 The Campaigns of 1644–45
 Montrose's Defeat
 Cromwell's victory at Dunbar
 The settlement of Scotland
 Portal to all things relevant to the military history of Scotland

Civil wars involving the states and peoples of Europe
Civil wars of the Early Modern period
Wars involving Scotland
Wars of the Three Kingdoms
17th-century military history of Scotland